Derek Jones may refer to:

Government
 Derek Jones (civil servant), Permanent Secretary to the Welsh Government
 Derek Jones (civil servant, born 1927) (1927–2008), British and Hong Kong government official
 Derek Jones (mayor) (1927–2013), English Congregationalist missionary and politician in Botswana

Sports
 Derek Jones (American football), American college football coach and former pro player
 Derek Jones (Canadian football) (born 1992), Canadian football defensive back
 Derek Jones (footballer) (1929–2006), footballer for Tranmere Rovers

Others
 Derek Jones (bishop) (born 1961), American Anglican bishop with the Church of Nigeria
 Derek Jones (musician), American musician
 Derek C. Jones (born c. 1946), economist at Hamilton College
 Derek W. Jones (born 1933), professor of applied oral science and biomaterials

See also
Derrick Jones (disambiguation)